From Here on In: The DVD 1997–2004 is a video compilation album of Australian punk rock band The Living End, released as a double-DVD in 2004. The album features video clips of the band's singles as well as a "supergig". The second disc contains a 2-hour documentary titled "In the End", which outlines the band's history.

Disc one
Music videos:
Prisoner of Society (US & Australian versions)
Second Solution
Save the Day
All Torn Down
West End Riot
Pictures in the Mirror
Roll On (US & Australian Versions)
Dirty Man
One Said to the Other
Who's Gonna Save Us? (US & Australian Versions)
Tabloid Magazine
I Can't Give You What I Haven't Got

"Supergig":
Roll On (Summer Sonic)
Save the Day (Splendour in the Grass)
One Said to the Other (Summer Sonic)
Prisoner of Society (Summer Sonic)
Blinded (Big Day Out)
West End Riot (Splendour in the Grass)
Pictures in the Mirror (Summer Sonic)
All Torn Down (Big Day Out)
Carry Me Home (Splendour in the Grass)
What Would You Do? (Big Day Out)
E-Boogie (Splendour in the Grass)
Second Solution (Summer Sonic)

Disc two
2-hour feature documentary "In the End"

The disc mistakenly lists the title of the documentary as "The End", leaving out the word "In". This caused speculation over a possible break-up of the band at the time of the DVD's release.

Charts

Certifications

References

External links
eeggs.com How to find "Dirty Man" hidden clip

The Living End albums
2004 films